The 1996–1997 LEB season was the inaugural season of the Liga Española de Baloncesto, the new second tier of the Spanish basketball.

LEB table

LEB Playoffs
The two winners of the semifinals are promoted to Liga ACB.

Relegation playoffs

Relegation system
There were not directly relegations of the last qualified teams in the league. If a team is the last qualified during two consecutive years or is between the two last teams during three seasons, losses its berth.

References
Scores and tables on Foros.acb.com

See also 
Liga Española de Baloncesto

LEB Oro seasons
1996–97 in Spanish basketball leagues
1996–97